The  Ultimate Soundtracker, or Soundtracker for short, is a music tracker program for the Amiga. It is the creation of Karsten Obarski, a German software developer and composer at a game development company EAS.

The Ultimate Soundtracker was the first music tracker, and a pioneer of its software category.

History 
Soundtracker started as a tool for game sound development for the Amiga. The program allowed for four-channel hardware mixing on all Amiga computers, but unlike subsequent versions, limited the number of samples/instruments in a song to 15. It allocated the four channels in strict fashion: melody (lead), accompaniment, bass, and percussion. It could export the tracks as a sequence of assembly instructions. A disk of instrument samples (ST-01) was distributed together with the program. 

Soundtracker was released as a commercial product in mid 1987. It did not enjoy success as a general music development software, with reviews calling it "illogical", "difficult" and "temperamental"; it was eclipsed in that market by programs such as Aegis' Sonix and Electronic Arts' Deluxe Music Construction Set. 

However, the interface that The Ultimate Soundtracker pioneered became a standard for game sound production on the Amiga. Despite the original version's issues some computer enthusiasts saw its good ideas; the original code of Ultimate Soundtracker was quickly disassembled, and illicitly improved, with no consideration to Obarski's intellectual property. Soundtracker II were released by the scene group The Jungle Command, followed by a plethora of further illicit versions, by multiple different scene groups, with countless improvements compared to the official and legal commercial version. The modified versions of the program were spread across the burgeoning Amiga warez scene. 

In November 1988 Obarski released the last official release, The Ultimate Soundtracker 2. While much improved over his previous official release, it was outcompeted by the collective work of the scene groups, which at the end of 1988 had far surpassed the capabilities of the official commercial version. 

In 1989, the program was further improved upon by two Swedish programmers, Pex “Mahoney” Tufvesson and Anders “Kaktus” Berkeman, who released a version known as NoiseTracker. Some versions turned out to be incompatible with the Amiga OS 2.0, causing crashes. Protracker was another successor, released in 1991, which solved the stability problems and made several changes to the user interface.

See also

 Chiptune
 List of audio trackers

Notes

References

Further reading
 Anders Carlsson (2008), Chip Music: Low Tech Data Music Sharing in Karen Collins (ed.), From Pac-Man to pop music: interactive audio in games and new media, Ashgate, 
 Interview with Obarski at the Amiga Music Preservation website

External links
 
 The Tracker History Graphing Project contains both SVG and Postscript graph of Soundtrackers' evolution.

Amiga music formats
Audio trackers
Amiga software
Public-domain software with source code